A memorandum, or memo, is a document recording notes or observations.

Memorandum may also refer to:
Memorandum (album), by Lacrimas Profundere
Memorandum (film), a 1965 documentary film
Memorandum Recordings, an Australian record label
The Memorandum, a 1965 play by Václav Havel

See also
Memo (disambiguation)
Memoranda (software)